France–Mali relations are the current and historical relations between France and Mali.

France was the former colonial overlord of Mali, then known as French Sudan, in which it ruled from the capital in Bamako. Bamako later became the capital of the newborn Republic of Mali. French rule had influenced Mali in several aspects, such as the adoption of the French language as the main language of Mali. Due to this, France and Mali have a strong connection. Both are members of Organisation internationale de la Francophonie. There are over 120,000 Malians in France. After 2020 relations soured as the new military government turned public opinion against France. On January 31, 2022, the Malian military junta expelled French envoy Joël Meyer.

Recent relations

Northern Mali conflict
In response to the rise of al-Qaeda in the Islamic Maghreb in 2012 following the collapse of Azawad as part of Northern Mali conflict, France deployed 4,000 troops and sent many military equipments in part of Operation Serval. France has been very cautious of Mali's situation, as Mali was a former colony of France and has ties with France.

In 2017, President Emmanuel Macron had vowed to fight every terrorist in Mali.

European nations led by France have criticized the anti-democratic practices of the military government. The government ridiculed France historic and recent roles and wants France to remove its 2400 troops. However even when its counter-terrorism mission is withdrawn, France will continue to provide aircraft military support to Malian troops fighting an Islamist insurgency in the Sahel.

Resident diplomatic missions 

 France has an embassy in Bamako.
 Mali has an embassy in Paris.

See also
Embassy of France, Bamako

References

External links
Embassy of France in Bamako 
Consulate of Mali in France 

 
Mali
Bilateral relations of Mali
Relations of colonizer and former colony